Angela Coleman (born 1963), daughter of New Orleans Fourth Municipal District Assessor Betty Jefferson, was one of four individuals indicted in 2009 by federal grand jury for the U.S. Justice Department's Eastern District of Louisiana.  The charges on violations of the Racketeer Influenced and Corrupt Organizations (RICO) Act were also directed against Betty Jefferson, Mose Jefferson, and Mose Jefferson's companion Renée Gill Pratt.

Brenda Jefferson Foster, a younger sister of convicted felon William J. Jefferson, had pleaded guilty to a minor charge in the same racketeering case. She agreed to a plea-bargain exchange by which she would testify against the others. On 2009 June 5 all the remaining defendants pleaded not guilty.

In all, according to New Orleans U.S. attorney Jim Letten, the charges involve 31 felony counts. These do not overlap the 16 felony counts alleged against Angela Coleman's uncle, former U.S. Representative William J. Jefferson.

At a hearing before U. S. District Judge Ivan L. R. Lemelle on 2009 June 17, lawyers for Betty Jefferson and Angela Coleman requested a delay from the 2009 August 3 start date for the racketeering trial; at the same hearing, however, lawyers for Gill Pratt and Mose Jefferson requested that the racketeering trial begin as scheduled on August 3. On 2009 July 28, Lemelle delayed the start of the racketeering trial to 2010 January 25.

If proved, the charges—raised under provisions of the Racketeer Influenced and Corrupt Organizations (RICO) Act—can result in up to 20 years' imprisonment, $250,000 in fines, and stiff penalties of forfeiture. Some of the charges involved fraudulent use of e-mail.

Notes

1963 births
Living people
Louisiana Democrats
People from Chicago
People from New Orleans
Women in Louisiana politics
21st-century American women